"3 Libras" is a song by alternative rock band A Perfect Circle. The song was the second single from their debut album Mer de Noms. The song was well received both critically and commercially, with it peaking at number 12 on both the US Billboard Modern Rock and Mainstream Rock charts in 2000.

Background 
As with all of the Mer de Noms album, "3 Libras'" music was written by guitarist Billy Howerdel, while the lyrics were written by vocalist Maynard James Keenan. The two originally envisioned the track to be the first single of their debut album prior to being talked into going with the hard rock track "Judith" by record label executives, who felt the track was a better lead off single due to it being less of a departure from Keenan's other band, Tool.

Two official remixed versions of the song have been made; the "Feel My Ice Dub Mix" by band member Danny Lohner, and the "All Main Courses Mix" by Robert "3D" Del Naja of Massive Attack. They were compiled in 2004 on the band's remix album Amotion.

Composition 
While much of Mer de Noms sound is identified with a conventional hard rock aesthetic, "3 Libras" sound is primarily driven by acoustic guitar and violin. Majority of the song consists of melodic, clean guitar tones, and a violin melody played over, composed by band bassist and violinist Paz Lenchantin. Drummer Josh Freese plays the rim of the drum kit on every eighth note, with the song being performed in 6/8. The song finishes with a full-band performance and distorted electric guitars in the song's outro, ending on a dark guitar chord.

Several alternate versions the song have very different compositions. The "Feel My Ice Dub Mix" featured a greatly slowed down tempo and added electronic beats and effects, giving it a more trance-like sound, where the "All Main Courses Mix" made extensive use of radio static and noise sound effects. When performed live, in absence of a dedicated violinist, the band would commonly play an alternate version of the song, with Howerdel playing clean electric guitar tones through the song, with the full band backing him with their respective instruments.

Reception 
The song was generally well received, commercially and critically. The song received significant radio airplay, charting at number 12 on both the US Billboard Modern Rock and Mainstream Rock charts. Critics praised the song. Sputnikmusic referred to the song as "one of the most beautiful songs APC ever released" and "one of the most emotional releases of the album". Artistdirect editor in chief Rick Florino  named the track one of the "Top 20 Maynard James Keenan Songs", calling it "...a tender moment of longing encased in a beautiful, blissful melody...'3 Libras' illuminates the singer's massive vocal range and ability." Florino separately praised the band's live composition of the song as well, stating that he felt it reached "heavenly heights" when performed by the band in their reunion tours in 2010.

Track listing 
All music composed by Billy Howerdel, all lyrics composed by Maynard James Keenan.

CD1
"3 Libras"
"Magdalena" (live)
"3 Libras" (Feel My Ice Dub Mix)
"Judith" (live)
"3 Libras" (live)

CD2
"3 Libras" (live in Phoenix)
"3 Libras" (All Main Courses Mix)
"Sleeping Beauty" (Live in Phoenix)
Interactive picture gallery (CD-ROM)

Charts

References

External links 
Music video

2000 singles
2000 songs
A Perfect Circle songs
Heavy metal ballads
Music videos directed by Paul Hunter (director)
Songs written by Billy Howerdel
Songs written by Maynard James Keenan
Virgin Records singles